Christopher Frederick Dawson (born 15 February 1952) is a British billionaire businessman; founder, owner and executive chairman of the British retail chain The Range. The ultimate owner is Dawson's wife, who registers as resident in Jersey, a place that offers tax savings over UK resident individuals.

According to the Sunday Times Rich List in 2022, Dawson and his family are worth £2.25 billion, an increase of £200 million from 2021.

Early life
Dawson was born in Plymouth, Devon, the son of a market trader. He attended Hooe Primary School and then Plymstock School. Dawson attended school irregularly, struggled with dyslexia, and left at 15 years old with few qualifications. He has since returned to Hooe Primary School to discuss business studies with students.

Career
Dawson started as a market trader in Plymouth. He sold seafood from the back of a van with his father, and later started his own venture selling perfume and jewellery from a suitcase.

CDS Stores 
Dawson started CDS Superstores (Chris Dawson Superstores) in 1989, and opened an outlet store in Sugar Mill Business Park in Plymouth called 'The Range Home, Garden & Leisure'. The store sold toys, home wares, DIY equipment and Jewellery.

The Range 
A 'The Range Home, Garden & Leisure' brand store was opened in Cardiff in February 2000; Dawson later bought the business park where this store sits. The Range was featured in The Sunday Times Top Track 250 companies from 2003 to 2012, once ranking at number 48. In 2015 the retail chain has about 100 stores, all of which are owned directly by Dawson.

Dawson's CDS Superstores International company started a subsidiary, CDS Group Services, a shop fitting company that has clients that include Lego, Lush Cosmetics, Levi's jeans and sister company The Range. CDS Group Services was listed in twelfth place in the Real Business Hot 100 Companies in 2012.

Awards and recognition 
Dawson was an ambassador for the Channel 4 Jobs Report in 2012, named the Ernst & Young Overall Entrepreneur of the Year in 2011, and in the same year advised the Prime Minister David Cameron on issues facing growing businesses. In 2012 he was interviewed by Justin Leigh on BBC Radio Devon,

Dawson was interviewed in 2013 for the series Peter Jones Meets.

In 2013, Dawson's businesses had an estimated worth to 585 million pounds. He has established several other companies involved in property, dry cleaning, manufacturing and waste management services.

In April 2015, the Sunday Times Rich List reported that his net worth was £1.65 billion which by March 2017 had increased to nearly £2.0 billion.

In 2019, Dawson handed all his shares to his wife Sarah Dawson, who resides in Jersey for tax purposes.

Personal life
Dawson lives in Plymouth with his wife Sarah. They have two children who also work for The Range family business.

As of 2014, Dawson owned a Rolls-Royce Wraith with the personalised number plate "DE11 BOY", a reference to the fictional character Del Boy Trotter.

References

1952 births
Living people
British retail company founders
Businesspeople from Plymouth, Devon
English billionaires